Ocean View Christian Academy (formerly Midway Baptist Schools) is a private Christian school serving grades K-12 in San Diego, California.

Christian schools in California
Education in San Diego
Private high schools in California
Private middle schools in California
Private elementary schools in California
Educational institutions established in 1977
1977 establishments in California